The Human Comedy is a 1983 musical with a book and lyrics by William Dumaresq and music by Galt MacDermot.

William Saroyan's tale originated as a screenplay he had been hired to write and direct for MGM. When the studio objected to its length and an uncompromising Saroyan was pulled from the project, he rewrote the story as a 1943 novel with the same title that was published shortly prior to the film's release.

Production
The Off-Broadway production, directed by Wilford Leach, opened on December 28, 1983 at Joseph Papp's Public Theater, where it ran for 79 performances.

The cast included Stephen Geoffreys as Homer, Bonnie Koloc as Kate, Don Kehr as Marcus, Mary Elizabeth Mastrantonio as Bess, Josh Blake as Ulysses, Rex Smith as Spangler, Gordon Connell as Grogan, Leata Galloway as Diana, Joseph Kolinski as Tobey, Caroline Peyton as Mary, and Laurie Franks as Miss Hicks.

Like Hair and A Chorus Line before it, The Human Comedy garnered reviews favorable enough to prompt Papp to transfer it a larger, uptown Broadway house. After twenty previews, with the Off-Broadway cast and creative team, it opened on April 5, 1984 at the Royale Theatre, where it ran for 13 performances.

Frank Rich's critique of the original production had been positive, but The New York Times policy prohibited re-reviewing shows unless they were changed substantially, so his earlier comments were overshadowed by those damaging ones made more recently by Clive Barnes, among others. The general consensus was that The Human Comedy, with its intimate story staged in a semi-oratorio style with no scenery save for rear projections used to define each scene's locale, was not suited for a large venue with a conventional proscenium stage. Following Dude and Via Galactica, it was MacDermot's third critical and commercial failure, and proved to be his last attempt at a Broadway musical.

An original cast album was recorded but never released until 1997, when an 86-track, 2-CD set was issued by Original Cast Records.

In 1997, the show had a partially staged reading at the York Theatre in New York City as part of the York's Musicals In Mufti series. The show was directed by Roger Danforth and featured Heather MacRae as Kate, Richard Roland as Spangler, Diane Sutherland (Fratantoni) as Diana, Alan H. Green as Tobey, Jennifer Rosin as Bess, James Ludwig as Marcus, Joe Hynes as Homer, Traci Lyn Thomas as Mary, Aisha DeHaas as Beautiful Music, Benjamin Stix as Ulysses and Ron Carroll as Grogan.

Overview
The coming-of-age tale focuses on young Homer Macauley, a telegram messenger who is exposed to the sorrows and joys experienced by his family and the residents of his small California town during World War II. Homer's mother Kate is struggling to support her children following the death of her husband, his older brother Marcus is in the Army, his teenaged sister Bess daydreams about romance, and his younger brother Ulysses divides his attention between the passing trains and an unrequited desire to know why his father had to die. Other characters include Spangler and Grogan, who run the telegraph office, Spangler's girlfriend Diana, Marcus's orphaned army buddy Tobey and Marcus's sweetheart Mary.

Through-composed, The Human Comedy is far more an American folk opera like Porgy and Bess than it is a traditional book musical. Its score includes elements of 1940s swing, gospel, pop, folk music, and typical show tunes. John Beaufort noted that "The adapters have provided a generous mix of musical idioms and rhythms: Love songs, jazzy upbeat numbers, a gospel hymn, and a variety of other compositions in the MacDermot manner. The moods range from jubilation to quiet reverie."

The CurtainUp reviewer of a 2006 regional production wrote:  "MacDermot and Dumaresq's sung-through vignettes are, like 'Porgy and Bess', best defined as an American folk opera...The absence of dialogue and the opera tag -- as well as an oratorio style staging (the absence of a musical's usual colorful scenery and choreography) no doubt helped to relegate 'The Human Comedy' to the status of "worthy flop." "

Song list

   
Act I      
In a Little Town in California
Hi Ya, Kid
We're a Little Family
The Assyrians
Noses
You're a Little Young for the Job
I Can Carry a Tune
Happy Birthday
Happy Anniversary
I Think the Kid Will Do
Beautiful Music
Cocoanut Cream Pie
When I Am Lost
I Said, Oh No
Daddy Will Not Come Walking Through The Door
The Birds in the Sky
Remember Always to Give
Long Past Sunset
Don't Tell Me
The Fourth Telegram
Give Me All the Money
Everything Is Changed
The World Is Full of Loneliness
Hi Ya, Kid (Reprise)

Act II      
How I Love Your Thingamajig
Everlasting
An Orphan I Am
I'll Tell You About My Family
I Wish I Were a Man
Marcus, My Friend
My Sister Bess
I've Known a Lot of Guys
Diana
Dear Brother
The Birds In The Trees/A Lot of Men
Parting
Mr. Grogan, Wake Up
Hello, Doc
What Am I Supposed to Do?
Long Past Sunset (Reprise)
I'm Home
Somewhere, Someone
I'll Always Love You
Hi Ya, Kid (Reprise)
Fathers And Mothers (And You And Me)

Awards and nominations
Tony Award for Best Featured Actor in a Musical (Geoffreys, nominee)  
Theatre World Award (Geoffreys and Koloc, winners)  
Drama Desk Award for Outstanding Featured Actress in a Musical (Koloc, nominee) 
Drama Desk Award for Outstanding Music (nominee)

References

Sources
Not Since Carrie: Forty Years of Broadway Musical Flops by Ken Mandelbaum, published by St. Martin's Press (1991), pages 339-41

External links
Lortel Archives listing
Internet Broadway Database listing

1983 musicals
Off-Broadway musicals
Broadway musicals
Musicals based on novels
Musicals by Galt MacDermot
Sung-through musicals